The National Universities Commission (NUC) is the major accreditation and regulatory body that enforces uniform standard and sets admissions capacity of every university in Nigeria.

The list comprises colleges, polytechnics, and universities owned by Federal Government, State Government and Private Individuals.

Colleges 
 Gombe State College of Legal Studies, Nafada.
 Gombe State College of Education, Billiri
 Federal College of Education(Technical), Gombe
 Federal College of Horticultural Technology, Dadin Kowa.
 Gombe State College of Nursing and Midwifery
 Umma College of Health Science and Technology
 JIBWIS College of Education.
 JIBWIS College of Arabic and Islamic Education.
 Abubakar Garba Zagada - Zagada College of Education.
Fountain College of Health Sciences and Technology, Gombe 
Performance College of Health, Science and Technology, Billiri
Garkuwa College of Health, Science and Technology Gombe
Dukku International College of Health, Science and Technology
Haruna Rasheed College of Health, Science and Technology, Dukku
Ilimi College of Health Science and Technology, Gombe
Gombe State College of Health Sciences and Technology,Kaltungo
Lamido School of Hygiene, Liji

Polytechnics 
 Federal Polytechnic, Kaltungo
 Gombe State Polytechnic Bajoga

University 
 Federal University Kashere
 Gombe State University
 Lincoln University College Kumo
 Pen Resource University
 National Open University of Nigeria

References 

Gombe